Sergiano Herbert Cairo  (born 29 November 1982), better known as Redouan Cairo is a Surinamese-Dutch kickboxer fighting in the Superkombat Fighting Championship where he is the 2013 Superkombat World Grand Prix Tournament Runner-up. Also a Mixed martial artist, he is a former WAKO-Pro world cruiser heavyweight K-1 rules -94.1 kg champion.

He is ranked #10 light heavyweight kickboxer of the world by Liverkick.com.

Career
Cairo was two times WAKO-Pro champion, intercontinental in 2011 and world in 2013.

He became WAKO-Pro K-1 rules Intercontinental Champion against Andrei Stoica after five round of fighting. They had a rematch on Superkombat event in Podgorica, Montenegro on February 25, 2012. Originally, it was announced that Stoica defeated Cairo via decision after 3 rounds. However, SK officials overturned the decision to a no contest as the judges actually scored the bout a majority draw. Stoica had also caused controversy by referring to Cairo as "the nigger" in his post-fight interview. Stoica himself apologized for the mistake, blaming his poor command of English.

On July 30, 2011, Cairo took on Dzianis Hancharonak in Las Vegas, NV, United States. The action started immediately and after scoring a knocked down twice in the second round, Cairo lost by TKO in round three.

Also in Monaco, Cairo won his second WAKO-Pro title. This time against Zinedine Hameur-Lain by KO in fourth round. His reign didn't last long as he lost title to Vladimir Mineev in Russia one month later.

He rematched Sebastian Ciobanu at Superkombat World Grand Prix 2013 IV in Giurgiu, Romania on October 12, 2013, and won with a brutal knee KO in round three.

He beat Jegish Yegoian by unanimous decision at the Superkombat World Grand Prix 2013 Final Elimination in Ploiești, Romania on November 9, 2013.

He competed in the Superkombat World Grand Prix 2013 Final in Galați, Romania on December 21, 2013, beating Giannis Stoforidis via TKO due to a broken hand in the semi-finals before dropping a unanimous decision to Frank Muñoz after an extension round in the final.

There was no winner in a rematch against Dzianis Hancharonak at Kickboxing Empire II in Las Vegas, Nevada, United States on March 8, 2014, as the fight ended up in draw.

Titles
Professional
 2014 Real Fighters World Champion -95 kg (1 Title Def.)  
 2013 WAKO-Pro K-1 rules World Champion -94 kg 
 2011 WAKO-Pro K-1 rules Intercontinental Champion -85 kg
Superkombat Fighting Championship
2014 Knockout of the Year nomination (vs. Ali Cenik) 
2013 Superkombat World Grand Prix Tournament Runner-up 
Amateur
 2006 IFMA World Muaythai champion 
 2002 Dutch amateur champion -86 kg

Kickboxing record

|-
|-  bgcolor="#FFBBBB"
| 2017-10-29 || Loss ||align=left| Levi Rigters || WFL: Manhoef vs. Bonjasky, Final 16  || Almere, Netherlands || TKO || 1 || 
|-
|-  bgcolor="#FFBBBB"
| 2017-04-23 || Loss ||align=left| Brian Douwes  || WFL - Champion vs. Champion, Semi Finals || Almere, Netherlands || Decision || 3 || 3:00
|-
|-  bgcolor="#FFBBBB"
| 2016-06-04 || Loss ||align=left| Igor Bugaenko  || |ACB KB 6: Battle in Brussels || Brussels, Belgium || Decision || 3 || 3:00
|-
|-  bgcolor="#FFBBBB"
| 2016-04-03 || Loss ||align=left| Luis Tavares  || WFL - Where Heroes Meet Legends || Hoofddorp, Netherlands || Decision || 3 || 3:00
|-
|-  bgcolor="#CCFFCC"
| 2016-03-05 ||Win ||align=left| Ashwin Balrak || The Battle  || Netherlands || KO || 1 ||    
|-
|-  bgcolor="#CCFFCC"
| 2015-12-06 ||Win ||align=left| Ibrahim El Bouni || Real Fighters: A Night 2 Remember  || Hilversum, Netherlands || KO || 5 ||    
|-
! style=background:white colspan=9 |
|- 
|-  bgcolor="#FFBBBB"
| 2015-10-18 || Loss ||align=left| Loren Javier || WFL "Unfinished Business", Semi Finals || Hoofddorp, Netherlands || Decision || 3 || 3:00
|-
|-  bgcolor="#CCFFCC"
| 2015-04-19 || Win ||align=left| Loren Javier  || The Best of all Elements || Almere, Netherlands ||  KO (left hook)|| 3 || 
|-
|-  bgcolor="#CCFFCC"
| 2014-11-30 ||Win ||align=left| Fred Sikking || Real Fighters: A Night 2 Remember  || Hilversum, Netherlands || Decision (Unanimous) || 5 || 3:00  
|-
! style=background:white colspan=9 |
|- 
|-  bgcolor="#CCFFCC"
| 2014-09-27 || Win||align=left| Ali Cenik || Superkombat World Grand Prix IV 2014 || Almere, Netherlands || KO (flying knee) || 3 ||  
|-
|-  bgcolor="#CCFFCC"
| 2014-06-08 || Win ||align=left| Patrick Veenstra || Fight Fans 10 || Amsterdam, Netherlands || Decision || 3 || 3:00
|-
|-  bgcolor="#c5d2ea"
| 2014-03-08 || Draw ||align=left| Dzianis Hancharonak || Kickboxing Empire II || Las Vegas, Nevada, USA || Decision (split) || 5 || 3:00
|-
|-  bgcolor="#FFBBBB"
| 2013-12-21 || Loss ||align=left| Frank Muñoz || Superkombat World Grand Prix 2013 Final, Final || Galați, Romania || Ext. r. decision (unanimous) || 4 || 3:00
|-
! style=background:white colspan=9 |
|- 
|-  bgcolor="#CCFFCC"
| 2013-12-21 || Win ||align=left| Giannis Stoforidis || Superkombat World Grand Prix 2013 Final, Semi Finals || Galați, Romania || TKO (hand injury) || 2 ||
|-  bgcolor="#CCFFCC"
| 2013-11-09 || Win ||align=left| Jegish Yegoian  || Superkombat World Grand Prix 2013 Final Elimination, Quarter Finals || Ploiești, Romania || Decision (Unanimous) || 3 || 3:00 
|-
|-  bgcolor="#CCFFCC"
| 2013-10-12 || Win ||align=left| Sebastian Ciobanu || Superkombat World Grand Prix IV 2013 || Giurgiu, Romania || KO (Knee) || 3 || 2:42
|-
|-  bgcolor="#c5d2ea"
| 2013-05-11 || Draw ||align=left| Abdarhmane Coulibaly || THE GAME || Saint-Denis, La Réunion || Decision  || 3 || 3:00
|-
|-  bgcolor="#FFBBBB"
| 2013-04-20 || Loss ||align=left| Vladimir Mineev || Battle of Moscow 11 || Moscow, Russia || Decision (Unanimous) || 5 || 3:00
|-
! style=background:white colspan=9 |
|-
|-  bgcolor="#CCFFCC"
| 2013-03-09 || Win ||align=left| Zinedine Hameur-Lain || Monte Carlo Fighting Masters || Monte Carlo, Monaco || TKO|| 3 || 
|-
! style=background:white colspan=9 |
|-
|-  bgcolor="CCFFCC"
| 2012-07-07 || Win ||align=left| Kolyo Ivanov || Superkombat World Grand Prix III || Varna, Bulgaria || TKO (Low kicks) || 3 || 
|-
|-  bgcolor="#FFBBBB"
| 2012-05-12 || Loss ||align=left| Sebastian Ciobanu || Superkombat World Grand Prix II 2012 || Cluj Napoca, Romania || TKO || 2 || 0:12
|-
|-  bgcolor="#c5d2ea"
| 2012-02-25 || NC ||align=left| Andrei Stoica || Superkombat World Grand Prix I 2012 || Podgorica, Montenegro || No contest || 3 || 3:00
|-
! style=background:white colspan=9 |
|-
|-  bgcolor="#FFBBBB"
| 2011-10-01 || Loss ||align=left| Frank Muñoz || Superkombat World Grand Prix III || Brăila, Romania || Decision || 3 || 3:00
|-
|-  bgcolor="#FFBBBB"
| 2011-07-30 || Loss ||align=left| Dzianis Hancharonak || Kickboxing Empire I || Las Vegas, Nevada, USA || KO || 3 || 2:06
|-
|-  bgcolor="#c5d2ea"
| 2011-07-04 || Draw ||align=left| Henriques Zowa || Death Before Dishonor || Almere, Netherlands || Decision || 3 || 3:00
|-  bgcolor="#FFBBBB"
| 2011-05-27 || Loss ||align=left| Ondřej Hutník || Grand Prix Chomutov || Chomutov, Czech Republic || Decision (Unanimous) || 3 || 3:00 
|-
|-  bgcolor="CCFFCC"
| 2011-04-30 || Win ||align=left| Andrei Stoica || K-1 Rules Kickboxing in Monaco || Monte Carlo, Monaco || Decision || 5 || 3:00
|-
! style=background:white colspan=9 |
|-
|-  bgcolor="CCFFCC"
| 2011-03-27 || Win ||align=left| Anzor Shihabahov ||  North Against South part 3 ||  || Decision || 3 || 3:00
|-
|-  bgcolor="#CCFFCC"
| 2010-12-23 || Win ||align=left| Hicham Achalhi || Slamm Klaar om te Bosse || Paramaribo, Suriname || Decision ||3 || 3:00
|-  bgcolor="FFBBBB"
| 2010-08-28 || Loss ||align=left| Filip Verlinden || Slamm Fighting with the Stars ||  Paramaribo, Suriname || Decision || 3 || 3:00
|-
|-  bgcolor="FFBBBB"
| 2009 || Loss ||align=left| Bahadir Sari ||  ||  Istanbul, Turkey || KO (Left hook) || 2 || 
|-
|-  bgcolor="#FFBBBB"
| 2009 || Loss ||align=left| Zinedine Hameur-Lain ||  || Contrexéville, France ||  ||  || 
|-
! style=background:white colspan=9 |
|-
|-  bgcolor="#CCFFCC"
| 2008-08-30 || Win ||align=left| Fred Sikking ||  Slamm The Return of the Iron Lady || Paramaribo, Surinam || KO (Spinning Left High Heel Kick) || 2 || 
|-
|-
| colspan=9 | Legend:

Mixed martial arts record

|-
|Loss
|align=center| 0–3
|Igor Kostin
| Submission (Rear-Naked Choke)
| Draka - Pro Draka MMA
| 
|align=center|3
|align=center|0:36
|Khabarovsk, Russia
|
|-
|Loss
|align=center| 0–2 
|Chinto Mordillo 
| KO
| WKN Spain
| 
|align=center|1
|align=center|
|Barcelona, Spain
|
|-
|Loss
|align=center| 0–1
|Chinto Mordillo
| TKO (Retirement)
| BBT - Black Bull Tournament
| 
|align=center|1
|align=center|1:36
|Barcelona, Spain
|MMA debut.

See also 
List of male kickboxers

References

External links
Official Superkombat Profile

1982 births
Living people
Surinamese male kickboxers
Heavyweight kickboxers
SUPERKOMBAT kickboxers